is a Japanese actor from Gifu Prefecture and raised in Nerima, Tokyo.

Filmography

Movies
Lovers' Kiss (2003)
Azumi (2003)
Battle Royale 2 (2003)
Azumi 2: Death or Love (2005)
Thirteen Assassins (2010)
Red Tears (2011)
Nintama Rantarō (2011)
Hard Romantic-er (2011)
Hakuji no Hito (2012)
Space Sheriff Gavan: The Movie (2012)
Kamen Rider × Super Sentai × Space Sheriff: Super Hero Taisen Z (2013)
Sanada 10 Braves (2016)
Cherry Boys (2018)
Nobutora (2021), Takeda Nobunao
 Tora no Ryūgi (2022)

TV drama
 Densetsu no Kyoshi (NTV, 2000)
 R-17 (TV Asahi, 2001)
 Gokusen (NTV, 2002)
 Yankee Bokou ni Kaeru (TBS, 2003)
 Water Boys (TBS, 2003)
 Yonimo Kimyona Monogatari Aketekure (Fuji TV, 2004)
 Ace wo Nerae Kiseki e no Chousen (TV Asahi, 2004)
 Ace wo Nerae! (TV Asahi, 2004)
 Ranpo R Kuro Tokage (NTV, 2004)
 Holyland (TV Tokyo, 2005)
 Division 1 Yuku na! Ryoma (Fuji TV, 2005)
 Ganbatte Ikimasshoi (KTV, 2005, ep1)
 Engine (Fuji TV, 2005)
 H2 (TBS, 2005)
 Renai Shousetsu (TBS, 2006)
 Shimokita Sundays (TV Asahi, 2006)
 Yaoh (TBS, 2006)
 Tenka Souran (TV Tokyo, 2006)
 Asakusa Fukumaru Ryokan 2 (TBS, 2007)
 Hanazakari no Kimitachi e (Fuji TV, 2007)
 Natsu Kumo Agare (NHK, 2007)
 Asakusa Fukumaru Ryokan (TBS, 2007)
Hanazakari no Kimitachi e SP as Tennoji Megumi (Fuji TV, 2008)
 Yagyu Ichizoku no Inbo (TV Asahi, 2008)
 Lotto 6 de San-oku Ni-senman En Ateta Otoko as Satake Shuichi (TV Asahi, 2008)
 BOSS as Ikegami Kengo (Fuji TV, 2009, ep10-11)
 LOVE GAME as Hidekatsu (NTV, 2009, ep8)
 Mieru Onna Tsukiko (NTV, 2011)
 Tokumei Sentai Go-Busters (2012) Geki Jumonji/Gavan Type G (Episodes 31 & 32)
 Uchu Sentai Kyuranger (2017) Geki Jumonji/Gavan Type G (Episode 18)

Anime
Black Jack: The Two Doctors of Darkness (2005)

References

External links
Official site

1982 births
Living people
Japanese male television actors